Karlen or Karlén is a surname. Notable people with the surname include:

Given name
Karlen G. Adamyan (born 1937), Armenian cardiologist
Karlen Asieshvili (born 1987), Georgian rugby union player
Karlen Avetisyan (1940 – 2004), Armenian painter and restorer
Karlen Mkrtchyan (born 1988), Armenian footballer
Karlen Varzhapetyan (1942 – 1984), Soviet Armenian director of television plays

Karlen Surname
Arno Karlen (1937 – 2010), American poet, psychoanalyst, and popular science writer
Gabriel Karlen (born 1994), Swiss ski jumper
Gaëtan Karlen (born 1993), Swiss footballer
Gregory Karlen (born 1995), Swiss footballer
 Heinrich Karlen, C.M.M. (1922–2012), Swiss Prelate of Roman Catholic Church
 Jean-Philippe Karlen (born 1972), Swiss footballer
 John Karlen (1933 – 2020), American actor
 Neal Karlen (fl 1991 – 2013), American journalist and non-fiction writer
 René Karlen (born 1907 – unknown), Swiss basketball player

Karlén Surname
Barbro Karlén (born 1954), Swedish writer
 Maude Karlén (born 1932), Swedish gymnast
 Vibjörn Karlén (born 1937), Swedish geologist

See also

Carlen (surname)
 Kallen
Karlyn
 Kaulen

Armenian masculine given names
Swedish-language surnames